During the 2005–06 season, Everton competed in the Premier League.

Season summary
Despite finishing in the coveted fourth place last season, Everton suffered a downturn this season. Early exits from both the Champions League and the UEFA Cup took their toll on player morale, and at the end of October the Toffees stood in the relegation zone. The club eventually rallied to secure a safe eleventh place in the final table – not high enough for any further European adventures the next season, and somewhat embarrassing for a side which had achieved so much last season.

The end of the season saw the retirement of Scottish striker Duncan Ferguson, the highest scoring Scotsman ever in the Premier League's history.

Final league table

Results
Everton's score comes first

Legend

FA Premier League

FA Cup

League Cup

UEFA Champions League

UEFA Cup

Squad

Left club during season

Player awards 
 Player of the Season – Mikel Arteta
 Players' Player of the Season –  Mikel Arteta
 Young Player of the Season –  James McFadden
 Reserve / U21 Player of the Season – Victor Anichebe
 Academy Player of the Season – Scott Phelan
 Goal of the Season – James Beattie vs. Fulham

Statistics

Appearances and goals

|-
! colspan=14 style=background:#dcdcdc; text-align:center| Goalkeepers

|-
! colspan=14 style=background:#dcdcdc; text-align:center| Defenders

|-
! colspan=14 style=background:#dcdcdc; text-align:center| Midfielders

|-
! colspan=14 style=background:#dcdcdc; text-align:center| Forwards

|-
! colspan=14 style=background:#dcdcdc; text-align:center| Players transferred out during the season

Starting 11
Considering starts in all competitions
 GK: #25,  Nigel Martyn, 27
 RB: #22,  Tony Hibbert, 38
 CB: #5,  David Weir, 40
 CB: #4,  Joseph Yobo, 34
 LB: #18,  Phil Neville, 43
 RM: #21,  Leon Osman, 32
 CM: #6,  Mikel Arteta, 35
 CM: #17,  Tim Cahill, 39
 LM: #14,  Kevin Kilbane, 29
 CF: #8,  James Beattie, 33
 CF: #11,  James McFadden, 29

Transfers

In
  Simon Davies –  Tottenham Hotspur, 26 May 2005, £3,500,000
  Per Krøldrup –  Udinese, 27 June 2005, £5,000,000
  Mikel Arteta –  Real Sociedad, 15 July 2005, £2,800,000
  Phil Neville –  Manchester United, 4 August, £3,500,000
  Matteo Ferrari –  Roma, 26 August 2005, season-long loan
  Andy van der Meyde –  Inter Milan, 31 August 2005, £2,000,000
  Alan Stubbs –  Sunderland, free, 20 January 2006
  Sander Westerveld –  Portsmouth, 24 February 2006, 28-day loan
  Andrew Johnson –  Crystal Palace, 26 May 2006, £3,500,000

Out
  Alan Stubbs –  Sunderland, free, 2 August 2005
  Marcus Bent –  Charlton Athletic, 17 January 2006, £2,000,000
  Per Krøldrup –  Fiorentina, 31 January 2006, £3,600,000

References

Everton F.C. seasons
Everton F.C.